Account planning brings the focus on the consumer into the process of developing advertising. Planning is a job function relating to the application of strategy and planning. The discipline and its tools and techniques help to build unique directions, propositions and communications concepts across advertising and marketing channels. The Account Planner, or simply Planner, has a role to identify and empathise with the target market and utilise multiple types of data (primary, secondary, web, usage) to unlock insight that creates value between the consumer, the brand and the category of Product (business) or service. The thoughts and observations are construed into a value proposition and make up a document, often called a Creative Brief, that is used to create and inspire advertising campaigns and other marketing communications.

Account planning is an advertising agency discipline and sometimes department that works alongside client facing managers (account management), buying advertising (media), and creating advertising (creative). Around the late 1970s and early 1980s, US ad agencies introduced this ‘new’ discipline from the UK called account planning which became a primary function in most US ad agencies in the 1990s. 'Account planners have often been called 'the left side of a creative brain'. Their primary function is to find consumer truth and insight that helps the creative teams create work that is not only entertaining and highly memorable but also relevant to the consumer and effective in the marketplace. Creative ideas that drive business are more typically the result of a strong collaboration between creative teams and account planners. Account planners (sometimes also called brand planners and strategic planners) use primary and secondary research to inform their strategic thinking and are ultimately responsible for the work that informs, and the penning of, the creative brief. If the creatives are closest to the idea, and the account manager is closest to the client, the account planner is closest to the consumer. The account planner is the person on an advertising team who is most likely to have spent time with consumers (for B to C) or customers (B to B), observing the consumer's path to purchase, by using research such as ethnographies, focus groups or quantitative/social studies, asking consumers how they think about and use the product or service. And in an era in which the brand is at least as important as a specific product (for instance, Nike as a brand has a place in the culture that far exceeds the particular performance characteristics of their shoes), the account planner is responsible for understanding the place of the brand in the consumer's mind. This is not just a simple research function -  planning truly begins when research ends - and account planners stay engaged in the campaign process from the initial client briefing and throughout the advertising cycle. Rather than offering research insights to others at a single point in time, they use research to continue to provide insights into the campaign process and most importantly these days, help track advertising effectiveness. Whereas previously, account planners focused on the use of traditional primary research tools, digital/social networks have given them the ability to listen to and interact with consumers in new ways and to work more closely with channel or media planners throughout the process closely also, to not only help plan effective advertising but also engage with consumers in the most effective ways.

History

Account planning is a job title that exists in most London and UK advertising agencies. Account planning gained an initial foothold in the US in the early 80s but really only evolved to become an essential function is in most mid to large sized agencies in the early 90s.

In Australia 1965, the earliest instance of the role, was conceived by David Brent, a senior researcher at Unilever who had served as a senior para-military police commander in a long, major counter-insurgency jungle war in Asia. Operative in the national secret service, he later changed to a more public life in ad agency account services, creative writing and media management. These qualifications, skills and experiences led to the launch of the new role in a Sydney agency in 1966.

Beginning in 1965, Stanley Pollitt felt that account managers were using information incompetently or inexpediently because the researcher was not involved in the campaign process. Because of this, Pollitt ៛suggested that a specially trained researcher should work with the account manager as an equal partner. After the opening of the Boase Massimi Pollitt (BMP) agency, in 1968, Pollitt introduced his idea, only slightly revised. Stephen King, believing that clients deserved a better way of doing things, proposed a process of advertising development that had a little less gut feeling and a little more scientific foundation. This process involved rigorous analysis of a brand and its position in the competitive market place. This process creates an advertising message from the marketing objectives and the client's business objectives. In 1968, J. Walter Thompson (JWT) established a new department called “account planning,” coined by Tony Stead.

The two independent UK pioneers of the vital new planning role, each 1967 and 1968, certainly achieved a dramatic innovation in the advertising industry. But what they and the global advertising industry appeared not to know was that an almost identical role had been conceived and successfully launched in Sydney, Australia in January 1966. Inspired by the marketing and market research management wisdom and skills of Unilever Australia. What were the differences?

The main difference was that while the two UK pioneers were well-recognized senior managers in successful ad agencies the unknown Australian pioneer had the advantage of superior skills and experience from world-best market research working closely together with world-best marketing at highly regarded global marketing leader and advertiser, Unilever, and its many famous brands. This  followed earlier comprehensive experience in ad agency account management and creative writing in Singapore and Sydney.

The time taken to determine the agency problem and the solution, the radical new concept of an ad agency specialist multi-skilled role, was nearly four years at Unilever Australia in 1965. The two UK pioneers appeared to take much longer.

In the UK initially there appeared to be considerable experimenting, changes, frustration and delay trying to determine the ideal formulation and qualifications for the person best suited for the new specialist agency role. In Australia there was no problem. The pioneer moved straight from Unilever to the first agency well-equipped with all the necessary world best marketing and market research skills and experience and his prior comprehensive ad agency experience.

In Australia the original new role was probably more comprehensive and holistic and concerned with total brand health including advertising compared to the UK where the pioneers were initially more concerned with the development of campaigns.

The UK pioneers developed the role comfortably in their agencies supported by colleagues and friends. In Australia it was much tougher with trail-blazing the radical new role in a defensive and suspicious industry with some determined to deny any acceptance of the planning pioneer.

An extremely vital aspect of the original ad agency multi-skilled planning role has never been specially highlighted before. This is the powerful added level of skills derived from the symbiosis of quality multi-skilling – marketing, market research, intelligence, planning and advertising -  which helps to develop superior insights and speedier outcomes that less qualified and involved planners find it difficult to achieve.

In the UK the pioneers are credited with devoting their skills in their large agencies to develop excellent education material and were devoted to training others in the complex new agency role. In Australia the pioneer planner did not  train others. He applied his own skills and experiences – marketing, market research, intelligence, planning and advertising – to successfully compete with non-planning agencies for new business and to build rapid growth in his agency. Much later he mounted a website – www.originplan.com – with case studies and client endorsements to demonstrate the outstanding success of the innovative new role inspired by Unilever Australia.

The backgrounds of the two UK pioneers were relatively straightforward – graduates from Oxbridge who entered the advertising industry, enjoying the culture, literary elegance and stylish ambience in their large and successful London ad agencies. The background of the Australian pioneer was very different. Early childhood in tropical Malaya and tragic family losses during the war against Japan;  completed education in the UK; entered military service  and served as a platoon commander in the defence of NATO; special training with the London Metropolitan Police; returned to his original home country, Malaya, in 1952 as a senior para-military police officer at the height of the Emergency, the counter-insurgency war against the brutal and ruthless communists and their aim to take over Malaya and Singapore; commanded several large police districts, commanded counter-insurgency jungle operations, served in the paramount secret service; contributed to an outstanding victory against militant communism; worked in market research and in ad agency account management and creative writing in Singapore and Sydney, Australia before joining Unilever Australia in 1962. The reader will recognize a background of the Australian pioneer with far greater diversity and exposure to major problem solving than by the two UK pioneers together with intense experiences involving skilled intelligence and investigative roles, a highly valued style of experience also in the later conceived radical new ad agency specialist role.

The account of powerful ad agency multi-skilled planning by the Australian pioneer is well supported by enthusiastic endorsements by ad agency chiefs and many highly appreciative advertiser managers with some equating the new and vital planning role with that of a marketing consultant.

Some references are – The Director General, Incorporated Society of British Advertisers [ISBA]. History of Advertising Trust [HAT]. Australian Market and Social Research Society [AMSRS]. Australian Association of National Advertisers [AANA]. All the aforesaid, also including the Advertising Association and the Institute of Practitioners in Advertising in the UK have received copies of endorsements by ad agency chiefs and appreciative advertiser managers, Articles in Australian industry journals including Ad News and B&T. The history of ad agency planning in Australia including many case studies and advertiser managers’ endorsements at afore mentioned www.originplan.com. Articles in the newsletters of the Australian Account Planning Group [APG] in 2005 and 2006. David Brent's appearance in the BBC TV documentary ‘Empire Warriors – The Intelligence War’ [2004] about the long war 1948-60 in Malaya against the communists.

From the UK to the US and Beyond
Several Agency groups began to recognise the value of this new discipline and its relevance to global mac clients. Given the success the JWT partnership of Stephen King and Judy Lannon had in servicing and growing business from the likes of Nestle, Unilever, a global Account Planning Council was established in the late 70’s, and included people like George Clements (Canada), Rena Bartos (USA), Rob Langtry and Maxine Krige (Australia).  Local departments adopted the methodology (e.g. JWT's ‘TPlan’) and offered research and planning to local and global clients (e.g. Kellogg, Unilever, Nestle, Kraft). Similar moves saw planning introduced by other Australian agencies in the late 1978/1979 (viz. Lintas, The Campaign Palace, McCann-Erickson). Trade media in Australia (B&T, Ad News) followed developments closely and help build market presence for the discipline.

The first local agency in the United States to develop an account planning department was Chiat\Day (now TBWA\Chiat\Day). Jay Chiat took notice of the new department that was being met with success over in the UK and throughout Europe. (Tran, 1999) Chiat believed that account planning was crucial to creative work and he also believed, at the time, that British creative work was far better than American work. He was also not a fan of typical market research, stating that it is "what already has been done." Planning is about discovering new things.

It has been stated that "Jay Chiat did not decide to experiment with account planning. He decided to have account planning." He knew that he had to integrate the idea into his already established agency. In 1982 he hired Jane Newman, a British planner, to come and work for his office in New York City. Newman had previously worked at BMP and Ammirati and Puris. To develop the department, Newman hand-picked Jeff DeJoseph from the Young and Rubicam media department to be her first planner on staff As the department grew, so did Chiat\Day. In ten years the agency grew from billings of $50 million to $700 million

Many agencies noticed the success of Chiat\Day, and desired to have their own account planning department. Their rationale was that it would be the key to their success as well. Many creative shops added planning departments, helping propel them from boutique to agency, and picking up national accounts along the way." (Tran, 1999) Other planners such as Jon Steel and Nigel Carr came over from the UK to help pioneer. (Newman, 1998) Companies such as Ogilvy & Mather, DDB Needham N.Y., and Goodby, Silverstein & Partners quickly restructured their agencies to fit in a planning department

In the US, a country with an average of 12 minutes of ad time per hour of television programming, the increasing number or proliferation of additional programming has contributed to an increasing number of advertisements and combined with the increase in new media channels such as digital/ on-line and the growth of mobile, this has led to a significant increase in what many consumers ultimately view as clutter.  For those marketers who had the fear of getting lost, planning seemed to be the magical tool to "break through the clutter." For, the "mantra" of account planning is "relevant plus distinctive equals more effective.

It was during the 1990s that account planning grew tremendously within the United States. (Tran, 1999) As of 1995, planning was "at a boiling point, spilling into every corner of the advertising landscape." (Goldman, 1995) Goldman states: "Agencies of every description want it or say they have it - even if they don't know what it is." After some of the best agencies in the field added account planning to their list of services, planning became a "buzz word" within the field. "Agencies of all sizes, specialties and philosophies began posting want ads, practically recruiting anyone who was 'related to the discipline.'"

Account planners, strategic planners, planners

"The account planner is that member of the agency's team who is the expert, through background, training, experience, and attitudes, at working with information and getting it used - not just marketing research but all the information available to help solve a client's advertising problems." - Stanley Pollitt

"Planners are involved and integrated in the creation of marketing strategy and ads. Their responsibility is to bring the consumer to the forefront of the process and to inspire the team to work with the consumer in mind. The planner has a point of view about the consumer and is not shy about expressing it." - Fortini-Campbell

The ultimate goal of the planner is to work with consumers as partners in the process of developing advertising. This relationship with the consumer allows planners to involve their input at every stage of the process and to inform and inspire creative ideas that guide and validate the resulting campaign in the consumers interests. Planners are the “consumer's representative” of the account team. According to Jon Steel advertising can exist without account planning, but planners add an element of creativity to the advertising mix. They are typically people who are interested in meeting people and talking to the consumers. Planners want to find out what makes people tick and use that market information and research data to guide the campaign process. It is the planner's job to take all this information and funnel it down into a short idea that helps inspire and directionalize the creative department.

Planners have the ability to bridge together their understanding of the consumer and the awareness of how this knowledge will be used within their own business. It is the account planners' job to understand and draw insightful conclusions not only from the consumer, but also the brand. Because communication channels have presently multiplied, it is even harder, and more crucial, for communication to break through this clutter and reach the target audience. The planner must provide "the edge" that will ensure that a client's message will do just this

According to Fortini-Campbell, there are five main roles that an account planner must fulfill; First, they must discover and define the advertising task. They have the job of organizing information about the consumer and the marketplace from every possible source, including the client and agency data and secondary research. Second, they prepare the creative brief. The creative brief is the tool that the creative department uses to conceptualize ads. Another main purpose of the brief is to define the proper positioning of a brand. Third, they are involved in creative development. During creative conceptualization, it is the account planner's duty to represent the consumer. They may also interact with the creative department through the sharing of initial consumer responses to ad ideas or advertising approaches. Fourth, they must present the advertising to the client. The planner informs the client of "how and why a consumer will react to [specific] advertising." Finally, they track the advertising's performance. Through their follow-up research, account planners track reactions to the ads in the actual marketplace and provide Creatives with additional information.

There are numerous characteristics that make for a good account planner. Fortini-Campbell state that a person must possess intelligence, experience, strong observational skills, and judgment. The account planning group adds that account planners must have the skills to "conceptualize and think strategically. They must also be able to argue their viewpoint coherently. Being a team player and having a strong personality are also positive attributes. Ideally, an account planner candidate will have some experience in market research, brands, advertising and communications, and people management.

The account planner is the bridge between the business side to the creative side of a marketing campaign. On the business side, the planner works with the account manager to understand what the client is looking for and then relate that to what the consumer wants. On the creative side, the planner helps to create an expressive snapshot or a single-minded directional creative brief to lead the way to the drawing board.

A good account planner is inspiring by nature, passionate for advertising and has respect for creativity. They are intuitive and curious about consumers and relationships. Planners must be educated in marketing and research techniques. Secretly planners must be little detectives looking for truth and understanding. They must also be numerate, imaginative, and creditable when it comes to translating and presenting research.

Planning process

It is safe to say that the way planning works varies from agency to agency, and even within an agency, from planner to planner. A typical account planning cycle starts with a study of the brief from the client and secondary research, meaning any research that is currently available. Then the planner must delve into the consumer and retrieve primary research that is applicable to the client brief. The planner must brief the creative on the upcoming campaign. Understanding the brand attitudes and its individual elements is important to the diagnostic research. At this point all the information must be funneled into a creative brief and presented to the creative team. It is important that the account planner rationalize the advertising and its message to the client. Once chosen or approved by the client the planner can take steps to pre-test the ads to ensure that the research, branding, message recall and ideas of the consumer are appropriately applied and at satisfactory levels. The account planner's job never ends. Once the advertising is public, the planner must constantly evaluate the campaign for effectiveness, so that changes can be made if necessary.

In today's advertising field, "almost every advertising agency (and their clients) benefits from a disciplined system for devising communications/advertising/commercial strategy and enhancing its ability to produce outstanding creative solutions that will be effective in the marketplace." It is the account planner's task to act as the "consumer's conscience" and guide this process through the use of their knowledge of the consumer.

Stanley Pollitt believed that the following three attributes are essential in producing effective account planning:

1) It means total agency management commitment to getting the advertising content right at all costs. This means creating effective advertising instead of focusing on maximizing profits or keeping the clients happy. Pollitt believed that you could only make "professional judgments about advertising content with some early indication of consumer response." He did not mean that this rule would "represent a choice between effectiveness and profits, stable client relationships, or outstanding creative work." It would represent the choice how to prioritize the three.

2) The agency commits the resources to allow planners to be more than temporary role players. Account planners must be given the leeway to work with the data and research that they see fit, and must not be pressured into working more, than say, an account director. If planners are stretched over too many accounts, their knowledge of the account and the consumer will suffer. The account planner and account director must form a relationship common to that of an art director and copywriter. The two roles "have a common aim," but bring forth different skills.

3) It means changing some of the basic ground rules. Once consumer response becomes the most important element in making final advertising judgments, it makes many of the more conventional means of judgment sound hollow. "Conventional means" representing the affection a Creative has over an idea or the prejudice of a client that challenges research evidence.

Fortini-Campbell state that, because the role of account planning varies from agency to agency, it must be "constantly worked at to be done correctly."

Essential truths

Account planning exists for the sole purpose of creating advertising that truly connects with consumers, according to Jon Steel. Planning has made its move to the forefronts of larger agencies in the US, thanks in part to Jon Steel, but for some it is still considered a luxury. In many accounts, the account directors will claim the development of strategy. In case there's no account planner on the account, it's a team effort; client, account director and creative director. It must be clear where account planning is creating an advantage. Account planning adds context, a wider perspective, guidance and opinion to advertising development.

Having an account planner involved in the account has led to more integration within the agency, which has resulted in better teamwork in trying to combine the needs of the client, the market and the consumer. Account planners stimulate discussions about things that were overlooked before, such as, purchasing decisions, brand-consumer relationship and specific circumstance evaluation.

The main change inflicted on advertising by account planning is, to approach every marketing challenge, starting with the consumer. Traditionally qualitative research has been conducted via focus groups, but it is the Jon Steel style of focus group - focus groups in a creative way - that has changed the way some agencies apply this kind of research. “The best research and strategic thinking in the world is absolutely worthless without a creative executions of similar stature,” Steel said. The goal, in turn, is to create and maintain a meaningful relationship with the consumers.

In present-day society, there is no doubt that consumers around the world have knowledge and interest in advertising. It is something that has become part of our society and it possesses a "means of contributing meaning and values that are necessary and useful to people in structuring their lives, their social relationships and their rituals." However, there is a difference among cultures concerning advertising. One such difference is between the UK and the US. While in the UK there is a high approval for advertising among consumers, consumers in the United States believe that advertising insults their intelligence. There are seven goals that have been achieved in the UK thanks to account planning:

 Having a planner on the account has led to more integration within the agency and better teamwork in trying to combine the needs of the client, the demands of the market, and the expectations of the consumer.
 The planner has brought an added dimension of understanding to the process of developing ads, by stimulating discussion about: purchasing decisions, the brand consumer relationship, and how the advertising is working in specific conditions.
 Helping to win new business: by instilling confidence in the prospective client as a result of a comprehensive and disciplined approach.
 Defining more tightly-focused strategies: the result of an enhanced understanding of the consumer.
 Stimulating creative development: the result of more productive contrast between the creative department and the consumer.
 Helping to sell ads: by explaining the way they work.
 The quality and creativity of advertising in the UK has grown in line with account planning, thus proving that the function has helped, rather than hinder this trend.

References 

Advertising